Louise Gonnerman (born March 21, 1947) is an American former professional tennis player.

Raised in River Edge, New Jersey, Gonnerman learned the game at the Oritani Field Club in Hackensack and attended River Dell Regional High School. In 1971 she won the Eastern Clay Court, Westchester,  New York State Indoor Championships and New York State Championships outdoor singles titles. She reached the number ranking in the East and twice featured in the singles main draw of the US Open during her career.

References

External links
 

1947 births
Living people
American female tennis players
People from River Edge, New Jersey
River Dell Regional High School alumni
Sportspeople from Bergen County, New Jersey
Tennis people from New Jersey
20th-century American women